Ronald Freedman (1917–2007) was an international demographer and founder of the Population Studies Center at the University of Michigan. He led pioneering survey research on fertility in Asia. Born in Winnipeg, Canada, Freedman grew up in Waukegan, Illinois. He received a BA in history and economics from the University of Michigan in 1939, and a master's degree in sociology in 1940. At the University of Chicago he completed prelims for his PhD in sociology before joining the U.S. Army in 1942 to serve in the Air Corps Weather Service.

Freedman was the recipient of many honors and awards over his career. He was a Guggenheim Fellow, a Fulbright Fellow, President of the Population Association of America, a member of the National Academy of Sciences, winner of the Irene B. Taeuber Award from the Population Association of America and the Office of Population Research. He was also a Laureate of the International Union for the Scientific Study of Population (IUSSP).

Freedman died on November 21, 2007, in Ann Arbor, Michigan, at the age of 90.

References

External links
 UM Population Studies Center 
 Ronald Freedman Obituary 

American demographers
Fellows of the American Statistical Association
1917 births
2007 deaths
Members of the United States National Academy of Sciences
Canadian emigrants to the United States
University of Michigan staff
University of Michigan College of Literature, Science, and the Arts alumni
Fulbright alumni